is a train station in Nakamura-ku, Nagoya, Aichi Prefecture, Japan.

However, with the relocation of Nakamura Ward Office, the station has been renamed to its present name on 4 January 2023.

Lines
Nagoya Municipal Subway
Sakura-dōri Line (Station number: S01)

Layout

See also

References

Railway stations in Japan opened in 1989
Railway stations in Aichi Prefecture